Lucy Beecroft, (born 7 October 1996 in Northumbria) is a professional squash player who represents England. She reached a career-high ranking of World No. 77 in October 2021.

References

External links 

English female squash players
Living people
1996 births
Competitors at the 2022 World Games
World Games silver medalists
World Games medalists in squash